Simon Gratz High School Mastery Charter, formerly Simon Gratz High School is a secondary school in Philadelphia, named after Simon Gratz (1840-1925), a member of the Philadelphia Board of Education.  Originally a public high school operated by the School District of Philadelphia, Gratz has been operated as a charter school by Mastery Schools since September 2011. Students from the previous public school's enrollment area are eligible to attend. It is the fifth Philadelphia high school operated by Mastery.

In 2012, the school was removed from the Persistently Dangerous Schools List while under the new management of Mastery. Part of the building is used for Mastery’s Prep Middle School (7-8th grade).

School uniforms
Gratz students are required to wear school uniforms consisting of red Simon Gratz uniform shirts, black pants or black shirt, and any color shoes.

Notable alumni
George J. Alexander, Dean Emeritus of Santa Clara Law School 
Harriett Amster, psychologist; pioneering researcher and lecturer in verbal meaning and lexical ambiguity processing 
Roy Campanella, MLB player
Pat Kelly (outfielder), MLB player
Bennie Briscoe, boxer
Zack Clayton, member of Basketball Hall of Fame
Roderick Coleman, NFL player
Mardy Collins, NBA player
Eddie Fisher, singer
David Goodis writer
William H. Gray III, U.S. Congressman and CEO, United Negro College Fund
Grayson Hall,  television, film and stage actress
Leroy Kelly, NFL player
Willie Mae James Leake, Mayor of Chester, Pennsylvania
Joan Little, activist
Aaron McKie, NBA player and coach
Nathan Milstein, virtuoso violinist
Alvin Mitchell, American football player
Neef Buck, rapper
Lobo Nocho, émigré jazz singer and painter in Europe
Marvin O'Connor, professional basketball player
Aaron Owens, streetball player
Harvey Pollack, NBA statistician
Ivan Robinson, professional boxer
Artie Singer, songwriter, music producer and bandleader
Lynard Stewart, professional basketball player
Meldrick Taylor, 1984 Olympic gold medalist amateur boxer, Professional boxer
Rasheed Wallace, NBA player
Young Chris, rapper
Earl Watford, NFL player
Jerry Yulsman, novelist and photographer

References

External links

The school's website - Mastery Charter Schools
 - 2008-2011
 - 1997-2007

School buildings on the National Register of Historic Places in Pennsylvania
School District of Philadelphia
High schools in Philadelphia
Educational institutions established in 1925
Public high schools in Pennsylvania
Charter schools in Pennsylvania
Late Gothic Revival architecture
1925 establishments in Pennsylvania
Gothic Revival architecture in Pennsylvania
Nicetown-Tioga, Philadelphia
National Register of Historic Places in Philadelphia